Yoon Ji-sung (born March 8, 1991) is a South Korean singer and actor. He is best known for finishing eighth in the second series of Produce 101 and is the former leader of South Korean boy group Wanna One. Following Wanna One's disbandment, Yoon established his career as a solo artist with the release of his first extended play Aside on February 20, 2019.

Career

Early life and pre-debut
Yoon Ji-sung was born as Yoon Byeong-ok (윤병옥) in Wonju, South Korea.

2017–2019: Produce 101 and Wanna One 

In April 2017, Yoon, alongside Kang Daniel, Kim Jae-han, Joo Jin-woo and Choi Tae-woong participated in Produce 101 Season 2 as trainees of MMO Entertainment. Yoon placed eighth in the show's final episode and made his debut with Wanna One during Wanna One Premier Show-Con on August 7, 2017, at the Gocheok Sky Dome with the debut mini-album 1×1=1 (To Be One).

Yoon actively promoted with Wanna One until its official disbandment on December 31, 2018 and continued to appear with the group until its final concert series Therefore, held at the Gocheok Sky Dome from January 24 to 27, 2019.

2019–present: Solo debut and military service
In January 2019, Yoon was cast as the male lead in the musical The Days.

He then released his first EP Aside on February 20, 2019 before embarking on his first fan meeting tour of the same name in Seoul, Macau, Taipei, Tokyo, Osaka and Bangkok.

On April 25, 2019, Yoon released a special album, Dear Diary, and subsequently held special fan meetings in Tokyo, Osaka and Seoul.

He released the digital single 'Winter Flower' on May 19, 2019, as a gift for his fans, after his enlistment as an active-duty soldier on May 14, 2019. The song was composed by and gifted to Yoon by Korean indie singer Coffee Boy.

During his enlistment, Yoon was cast in the military musical Return: The Promise of the Day. He was expected to be discharged from the military on December 13, 2020, but he was discharged early from the military due to COVID-19 protocol on November 20, 2020.

Yoon returned with his second EP Temperature of Love on April 15, 2021.

On April 6, 2022, it was announced that Yoon had signed an exclusive contract with DG Entertainment. He released his third EP Miro on April 27, 2022.

Yoon's first solo concert 'Miro: Prologue' was held on May 14 and 15 at the COEX Artium.

On November 21, 2022, DG Entertainment announced that Yoon would be releasing "December 24th" a winter single through various online music sites on December 5 and holding an offline Fan-Con '2022 Yoon Ji-sung Fan Concert on the 24th of December.

Discography

Extended plays

Singles

Soundtrack appearances

Theatre

Filmography

Television series

Television shows

Web shows

Awards and nominations

Theatre

Notes

References

External links

1991 births
Living people
People from Wonju
Produce 101 contestants
South Korean television personalities
South Korean male idols
South Korean pop singers
South Korean dance musicians
South Korean male musical theatre actors
21st-century South Korean singers
K-pop singers
Swing Entertainment artists
Wanna One members
Reality show winners